The Ulsan Hyundai Mobis Phoebus is a professional basketball club in the Korean Basketball League.

History

Foundation and amateur era
Before the professional Korean Basketball League was established in 1997, domestic basketball was an amateur sport and teams were sponsored by corporate companies or private universities. Ulsan Hyundai Mobis Phoebus traces its origins to the basketball team sponsored by Kia Motors in 1986. The team was based in Busan where Kia Motors had manufacturing operations.

During the amateur era, all teams competed in the National Basketball Festival (농구대잔치). The Kia team dominated the late 1980s, despite being relatively new compared to Samsung Electronic and Hyundai's teams (now Seoul Samsung Thunders and Jeonju KCC Egis, respectively). Their roster at that time consisted of the legendary Chung-Ang University quartet: centers Han Ki-bum and Kim Yoo-taek, all-rounded shooting guard Hur Jae and record-breaking point guard Kang Dong-hee. The "Hur-Dong-Taek Trio" would later be retrospectively dubbed the most formidable offensive unit of the amateur era.

Professional era (1997–2001)
With the founding of the KBL, Kia chose to register its team and joined the league as Busan Kia Enterprise. They won the inaugural KBL Championship. Although they finished the next two seasons as championship runners-up, the team went through a period of upheaval. As with many major corporations, Kia Motors suffered from the 1997 Asian financial crisis, which had hit South Korea hard. Kia was bought over by Hyundai Motor Company in 1998 but the basketball team remained solely under Kia and retained the name. The team was unable to go through a generational change due to financial constraints and the aging squad found themselves behind other teams, especially a much younger Daejeon Hyundai Dynat team driven by the likes of Lee Sang-min and Choo Seung-gyun. Han had already retired by then while Hur and Kang both left for other teams for various reasons.

Hyundai then acquired the basketball team prior to the 2001–02 season as it was no longer feasible for Kia to sponsor a sports team. The team moved to its current home city of Ulsan.

Ulsan era (2001–present)
The first several seasons after the move were forgettable, as the newly-renamed Ulsan Mobis Automons mostly finished in the bottom half of the league table. Incumbent head coach Yoo Jae-hak, himself a former Kia player during the amateur era, was hired in 2004. At the rookie draft that year, Mobis won the lottery for the first overall pick and Yoo drafted Yang Dong-geun, who would go on to become the team's longest-serving player.

Current roster

Enlisted players

Honours

Domestic

Korean Basketball League
KBL Championship
 Winners (7): 1997, 2006–07, 2009–10, 2012–13, 2013–14, 2014–15, 2018–19
 Runners-up (3): 1997–98, 1998–99, 2005–06

KBL Regular season
 Winners (7): 1997, 2005–06, 2006–07, 2008–09, 2009–10, 2014–15, 2018–19
 Runners-up (5): 1998–99, 2012–13, 2013–14, 2015–16, 2020–21
 Third place: 1997–98

Continental
FIBA Asia Champions Cup
 Winners: 1992
 Runners-up: 1997
 Third place: 1995

ABA Club Championship
 Runners-up: 2013

References

External links

 Official website 
 Asia-Basket.com

 
Basketball teams in South Korea
Korean Basketball League teams
Basketball teams established in 1986
Sport in Ulsan
Hyundai Motor Group
1986 establishments in South Korea